Randolph Isham Stow (17 December 1828 – 17 September 1878) was an English-born Australian Supreme Court of South Australia judge.

Early life 
Stow was born in Framlingham, Suffolk, England and baptised at Water Lane-Independent, Bishops Stortford, Hertfordshire, England on 28 May 1829, the eldest son of the Reverend Thomas Quinton Stow and his wife Elizabeth, née Eppes. The family migrated to  Adelaide, South Australia in 1837; Randolph and his brothers Jefferson and Augustine were educated at home by their father and at a school run by D. Wylie. M.A.

Career and Education 
Randolph Stow showed great ability as a boy and was articled (apprenticed by contract) to a firm of lawyers, Messrs. Bartley and Bakewell. Shortly after the completion of his articles Stow became a junior partner in the firm. In 1859 Stow started a business for himself. Later, Stow was a partner with T. B. Bruce (1862–1872) and F. Ayers.

Stow was a member of the South Australian House of Assembly as member for West Torrens 1861–2, for Victoria 1863–65, East Torrens 1866-68 and Light 1873–75.
In October 1861 Stow became Attorney General in the Waterhouse (ministry which held office until July 1863). Stow was Attorney General again in the Henry Ayers and Arthur Blyth ministries from July 1864 to March 1865 and then lost his seat. He was now one of the leaders of the South Australian bar, and became a Queen's Counsel in this year.  By 1875 Stow was the unchallenged leader of the bar at Adelaide, and on 15 March 1875 was appointed judge of the Supreme Court, in place of William Alfred Wearing, who died on the wreck of the SS Gothenburg. Stow's health, however, had not been good for some time, and he had a heavy workload; he died age 49 of atrophy of the liver on 17 September 1878. He left a widow, four sons and two daughters. One of his sons, Percival Randolph Stow, later married K. Langloh Parker.

As a member of parliament Stow was regarded as a first-rate debater and took a leading part as Attorney-General in putting through legislation of much value. As an advocate he possessed an accurate knowledge of law, but he made his greatest impression as a judge although he was on the bench for less than four years. At the time of his death there was a general feeling that South Australia had lost a great judge, and many years later Sir John Downer who became a Q.C. in the year Stow died, said of him that he was 
"one of the greatest judges Australia ever had. A commanding presence, a striking face, an exquisite voice, unusual swiftness in comprehension, with an immense combination of eloquence and power". (Quoted at the time of Downer's death in The South Australian Advertiser, 3 August 1915).

The Stow medal 
The Stow Scholarship and medal was awarded to any law student who was most successful at the final examinations in each of three successive years. Early recipients were:
(Francis) Leslie Stow, his son, in 1892.
Frederick William Young 1897
Richard William Bennett, Stanley Herbert Skipper both qualified 1901. It appears Bennett was awarded the medal to the exclusion of Skipper.
James Leslie Gordon 1904, killed at Gallipoli in August 1915
Marmion Matthews Bray 1907
G. C. Ligertwood 1910
Edgar L. Stevens 1919. He was a son of Charles John Stevens (1857–1917) of the Register
Gwendolen Helen Ure (later McCarthy) 1923
(Duncan) Campbell Menzies 1939
(Francis) Peter Kelly 1937. He was a son of Frank Kelly LLB
William Andrew Noye Wells 1945

Family
Randolph Isham Stow married Frances Mary MacDermott (1836 – 25 December 1914), daughter of Marshall MacDermott on 7 November 1854 at Christ Church, North Adelaide. Their family included:
Percival Randolph Stow (c. 1857 – 20 December 1937) married Catherine Somerville "Kate" Langloh-Parker (1 May 1856 – 27 March 1940), widow of  wealthy pastoralist Langloh-Parker. He was a lawyer, in partnership with Sir Josiah Symon and Arthur William Piper from 1892 to 1898.
Ella Harriet Stow (15 October 1858 – 1 June 1944)
Adelaide Elizabeth Stow OBE (31 May 1859 – 14 February 1945) married Lieutenant (later Vice-Admiral Sir) William Rooke Creswell (20 July 1852 – 20 April 1933) on 29 December 1888
Reginald Marshall Stow (6 Sep 1862 – 26 April 1920) married Gertrude Mary Sullivan (1890–1982) on 28 April 1915 in York, Western Australia
Ernest Alfred Stow (18 January 1864 – 27 March 1885)
Francis Leslie Stow LLD (16 Oct 1869 – 12 May 1935) married Annie Duxbury (1 April 1869 – ) on 6 May 1895. He was the first to graduate LLD. from the University of Adelaide, and the first to win the Stow Scholarship and medal, founded in honor of his father. He served as Crown Solicitor and Crown Prosecutor in Perth, Western Australia.

References

 

|-

|-

|-

|-

Australian people of English descent
Australian people of American descent
1828 births
1878 deaths
Judges of the Supreme Court of South Australia
Members of the South Australian House of Assembly
Attorneys-General of South Australia
Australian King's Counsel
Colony of South Australia judges
19th-century Australian politicians